Bilsko or Bílsko may refer to:

 Bilsko, Lesser Poland Voivodeship, a village in Poland
 Bilsko, Lublin Voivodeship, a village in Poland
 Bílsko (Olomouc District), a village in the Czech Republic
 Bílsko (Strakonice District), a village in the Czech Republic